Tae-ho is a Korean masculine given name. The meaning differs based on the hanja used to write each syllable of the name. There are 20 hanja with the reading "tae" and 49 hanja with the reading "ho" on the South Korean government's official list of hanja which may be used in given names.

People with this name include:
Bak Tae-ho (born 1947), South Korean voice actor
Lee Tae-ho (born 1961), South Korean footballer
Kim Tae-ho (born 1962), South Korean politician
Kim Tae-ho (born 1975), South Korean television director
Kim Tae-ho, stage name Choi Jin-hyuk (born 1985), South Korean actor

See also
List of Korean given names

References

Korean masculine given names